The following is a list of Minangkabau clans.  The clans are listed in alphabetical order.  The clans in bold indicate the parent clans with their sub-clans are written in italic.

List of Minangkabau clans

A 
 Ampu
 Anak Aceh - in Negeri Sembilan
 Anak Malako - in Negeri Sembilan

B 
 Banuhampu
 Banuo
 Bapayuang
 Baraguang
 Barajo
 Batu Balang - in Negeri Sembilan
 Batu Hampar (abbreviated as Tompar, including Batu Hampar Minangkabau, Batu Hampar Patani) - in Negeri Sembilan
 Batu Kambiang
 Batu Pahek
 Bawang
 Bandang (including Bandang Ateh Bukik, Bandang Rumah Baru, Bandang Salek)
 Bicu (including Bicu Sajo, Bicu Sipanjang)
 Biduando (abbreviated as Dondo, including Biduando Lelo Maharajo Warih Jakun, Biduando Sadia Rajo Warih Jao, Biduando Sari Maharajo, Biduando Tampin) - in Negeri Sembilan
 Bilang Ijin
 Bodi (including Bodi Batino, Bodi Caniago, Bodi Jantan)

C 
 Caniago (including Caniago Baruah, Caniago Bawah, Caniago Nan Baranam, Caniago Sabarang, Caniago Ujuang)
 Cocoh
 Cubadak
 Cupak

D 
 Datuak Kitan Putiah
 Dalimo (including Dalimo Panjang)
 Dendang
 Depati (including Depati Manggumi, Depati Mudo, Depati Sakungkuang)
 Domo
 Durian nan Limo Ruang

G 
 Gantiang
 Guci

H 
 Hapai nan Tigo Ibu

J 
 Jambak (including Jambak nan Balimo)

K 
 Kabaru
 Kalumpang
 Kampai (including Kampai Aia Angek nan Baranam, Kampai nan Duo Puluah Ampek, Kampai Tangah Niua Gadiang nan Baranam)
 Kampuang Dalam
 Kampuang Gadang
 Karak
 Kinari
 Korong Gadang
 Koto (including Koto Dalimo, Koto Diateh, Koto Kaciak, Koto Kaciak Ampek Paruaik, Koto Kampuang, Koto Kerambil, Koto Piliang, Koto Sipanjang)
 Kutianyia (including Kutianyia Baruah, Kutianyia Ikua Pancah, Kutianyia Kampuang Tangah, Kutianyia Kapalo Bancah, Kutianyia Kapalo Labuah, Kutianyia Pitopang, Kutianyia Tabel Lintang)

L 
 Laweh
 Lubuak
 Lubuak Batuang

M 
 Maih
 Malayu (including Malayu Badarah Putiah, Malayu Baduak, Malayu Balai, Malayu Baruah, Malayu Bandang, Malayu Bongsu, Malayu Basa, Malayu Bungo, Malayu Cikarau, Malayu Gandang Parak, Malayu Kumbuak Candi, Malayu Kumbuak Harum, Malayu Lampai, Malayu Lua, Malayu Panjang, Malayu Patar, Malayu Siat, Malayu Talang, Malayu Tobo, Malayu Tangah)
 Mandaliko (including Mandaliko Budur, Mandaliko Tangah Gadang, Mandaliko Tangah Patah)
 Mandahiliang (including Mandahiliang Panai, Mandahiliang Gadang, Madahiliang Subarang)
 Mansiang
 Marajo Basa
 Marajo Lelo
 Mejan
 Mungka - in Negeri Sembilan

N 
 Nangkapuh (Kandang Kapuh)
 Nan Sambilan

P 
 Paga Cancang
 Pamangku
 Panampuang
 Pangian Kaciak
 Panyalai
 Parik (including Parik Cancang)
 Parindari
 Payobada (including Payobada Ateh, Payobada Kubang, Payobada Sungkai, Payobada Kunpanjang)
 Piliang (including Piliang Barum, Piliang Bongsu, Piliang Cocoh, Piliang Dalam, Piliang Koto, Piliang Koto Kaciak, Piliang Laweh, Piliang Patar, Piliang Sani, Piliang Sati)
 Pisang
 Pitopang (including Pitopang Basah, Pitopang Darek, Pitopang Dibawah, Pitopang Ditangah, Pitopang Gadang, Pitopang Koto Tuo, Pitopang Lado, Pitopang Rumah Panjang)
 Panggang
 Payakumbuh - in Negeri Sembilan
 Pungkuik

R 
 Rabu
 Rio Mudo

S 
 Saibi
 Salo (including Salo-Kutianyia, Salo-Caniago)
 Sambilan Niniak
 Saratuih
 Sari Lamak (abbreviated as Solomak, including Sari Lamak Minangkabau, Sari Lamak Pahang) - in Negeri Sembilan
 Sawah Jauah
 Seboang
 Sialiali
 Sikumbang (including Sikumbang Ampek Ibu, Sikumbang Gadang)
 Simabua
 Simalanggang (including Simalanggang Minangkabau, Simalanggang Naning, Simalanggang Ampek Ibu, Simalanggang Minangkabau Kandung, Simalanggang Rokan, Simalanggang Panglima Bongsu) - in Negeri Sembilan
 Sumagek
 Sunan Sarajo
 Sinapa (Sungai Napar)
 Supanjang

T 
 Tabek Gadang
 Tali Kincia
 Tanah Data - in Negeri Sembilan
 Tangah Sawah
 Tanian
 Tanika
 Tanjuang (including Tanjuang Batu, Tanjuang Gadang, Tanjuang Talago)
 Tapi Aia
 Tigo Batu - in Negeri Sembilan
 Tigo Lareh
 Tigo Niniak - in Negeri Sembilan

See also 
Minangkabau clans
Minangkabau Highlands
Minangkabau language
Minangkabau people

References 

Minangkabau
Indonesia-related lists